The 2019 Rochdale Metropolitan Borough Council election took place on 2 May 2019 to elect members of Rochdale Metropolitan Borough Council in England. This was on the same day as other local elections.

Overall Results 
Vote share changes compared to 2018.

Ward results
Councillors seeking re-election are marked with an asterisk; they were last elected in 2015 and changes are compared to that year's election.

Balderstone & Kirkholt

Bamford

Castleton

Central Rochdale

East Middleton

Healey

Hopwood Hall

Kingsway

Littleborough Lakeside

Mikstone & Deeplish

Milnrow & Newhey

Norden

North Heywood

North Middleton

Smallbridge & Firgrove

South Middleton

Spotland & Falinge

Wardle & West Littleborough

West Heywood

West Middleton

By-elections and other changes
Councillor Alan McCarthy (elected 2018 for Labour in the West Heywood ward) defected from Labour to the Brexit Party on 4 July 2019. Joined Conservative Party June 2021

Councillor Jacqui Beswick (elected 2019 for Labour in the West Heywood ward) resigned from the Labour party on 4 July 2019 to sit as an independent. Joined Conservative Party June 2021

Councillor Kath Nickson (elected 2018 for Labour in the Balderstone & Kirkholt ward) defected from the Liberal Democrats to the Brexit Party on 10 July 2019. Now sits as Conservative

Former council leader Richard Farnell (elected 2016 for Labour in the Balderstone & Kirkholt ward) resigned from the Labour Party on 18 July 2019 to sit as an independent. He had been suspended since April 2018 after a national child abuse inquiry found he lied under oath. In a statement he said he had "no confidence" he would receive a fair disciplinary hearing and could "no longer support a party led by Jeremy Corbyn".

References

2019 English local elections
2019
2010s in Greater Manchester
May 2019 events in the United Kingdom